The Lăpușnicul Mic (also: Lăpușnic) is a left tributary of the river Râul Mare in Romania. It discharges into the Gura Apelor reservoir.

References

Rivers of Romania
Rivers of Hunedoara County